Saagaromyces is a genus of fungi in the family Halosphaeriaceae. The genus contains three species.

References

External links
Saagaromyces at Index Fungorum

Microascales